Karl-Erik Grahn (5 November 1914 – 14 March 1963) was a Swedish football midfielder/forward who played for Sweden in the 1936 Olympic Games and the 1938 FIFA World Cup. He also played for IF Elfsborg.

References

External links

1914 births
1963 deaths
Swedish footballers
Sweden international footballers
Association football midfielders
Allsvenskan players
IF Elfsborg players
1938 FIFA World Cup players
Olympic footballers of Sweden
Footballers at the 1936 Summer Olympics
Sportspeople from Jönköping
20th-century Swedish people